The Pink Squirrel is a cocktail made of

 1 oz crème de Noyaux
 1 oz crème de cacao
 1 oz heavy cream

Shake with ice, strain into a cocktail glass and serve.

The drink was invented at Bryant's Cocktail Lounge in Milwaukee, Wisconsin. The Pink Squirrel was invented as an ice cream drink. In fact, it is still served as an ice cream drink both in Milwaukee and in many other parts of the upper Midwest. The Pink Squirrel is one of 3 typical ice cream drinks commonly served in Wisconsin Supper Clubs; with the others being a Brandy Alexander and Grasshopper.

Reference List

Cocktails with liqueur
Cocktails with chocolate liqueur
Cocktails with ice cream
Creamy cocktails